Anthony Leonard Bright (born March 28, 1977) is a former Canadian and American football wide receiver.  He played for the Jacksonville Tomcats of the af2, the Carolina Panthers of the NFL and the Calgary Stampeders of the CFL.  Bright played college basketball at Valencia Community College.

References

1977 births
Living people
Players of American football from Florida
American football wide receivers
Carolina Panthers players
Canadian football wide receivers
Calgary Stampeders players
Valencia Matadors football players
Orlando Predators players
Philadelphia Soul players
Jacksonville Tomcats players
Scottish Claymores players
Las Vegas Gladiators players
Grand Rapids Rampage players